Swati language or siSwati or Swazi is a Bantu language of the Nguni group spoken in Eswatini and South Africa by the Swazi people.

Swati language may also refer to:
 Torwali language, a language spoken in Swat, Khyber Pakhtunkhwa Province, Pakistan
 Kalami language, a language spoken in Swat, Khyber Pakhtunkhwa Province, Pakistan
 Swati, a dialect of the Pashto language spoken in Swat, Khyber Pakhtunkhwa Province, Pakistan
 Swati, a dialect of the Gujari language spoken in Swat, Khyber Pakhtunkhwa Province, Pakistan
 Swati, a dialect of the Hindko language spoken in Swat, Khyber Pakhtunkhwa Province, Pakistan

See also  
 Swati (disambiguation)